Redin is a surname. Notable people with the surname include:

Antoine Redin (1934–2012), French footballer and manager
Bernardo Redín (born 1963), Colombian footballer and manager
Martin de Redin (1579–1660), Spanish military officer and politician
Mikael Redin (born 1989), Swiss figure skater